Eoin Kevin Joseph Colin Hand (born 30 March 1946) is an Irish former footballer and football manager. As a player, his normal position was centre-half. He works as a television and radio football commentator for RTÉ in Ireland.

Playing career
Hand played schoolboy football with Stella Maris. As a 17-year-old, Hand was signed by Swindon Town but the move did not work out and he returned quickly to Ireland. He started his League of Ireland career with short spells for Dundalk F.C. and Shelbourne F.C. but it was with Drumcondra F.C. that he found most success.

After a series of outstanding displays, he was signed by Portsmouth F.C. for a transfer fee of £8,000 in October 1968. Hand impressed enough at Portsmouth to earn a call up to the Republic of Ireland national football team and went on to earn 19 caps for his country. He stayed with Portsmouth until being released at the end of the 1975–76 season. After a brief spell in South Africa, Hand was persuaded back into football by Shamrock Rovers making his debut on 9 October 1977 at Glenmalure Park. However, after only nine games he returned to Portsmouth F.C. He left again in 1979, after playing a total of 277 times in the league for them.

Managerial career
In 1979, Hand was appointed player-manager of Limerick United. He immediately sparked a revival in Limerick's fortunes and they won the 1979–80 League of Ireland in Hand's first season. They landed a European Cup tie with Real Madrid and Hand was rewarded with the Irish national team manager's job. He was the 1980 Soccer Writers' Association of Ireland Personality of the Year. He also won the FAI Cup in 1982. For a short time, he tried to combine both jobs but with business commitments in Dublin, he left Limerick and concentrated on the Ireland job.

In Hand's first World Cup qualifying campaign, Ireland narrowly lost out to France on goal difference. Ireland conceded a late goal to Belgium after having what some commentators describe as a 'perfectly good goal' disallowed. The image of Hand on the bench with his head in his hands post match is widely shown in Ireland as one of Irish sport's most heartbreaking images.

Ireland finished an unremarkable third in the qualifying campaign for Euro 84 and, shortly afterwards, Hand combined club and international management again when he was appointed manager of St Patrick's Athletic FC, however, he stayed only one season with the Dublin club. His managerial contract was finished when he failed to qualify for the 1986 World Cup; he was replaced by Jack Charlton.

In 1988, he was appointed manager of Huddersfield Town and remained there until 1992. He also managed Shelbourne F.C. briefly during the 1993–94 season.

FAI work
Hand began working with the FAI in 1999 as a career guidance officer. His position was terminated in July 2012. Following this, he took a case of unfair dismissal against the FAI and was initially successful. The FAI appealed this decision to the Labour Court and were ultimately successful. The Court found that Hand had been a consultant to the FAI at all times rather than an employee.

During his tenure as career guidance officer, Hand played a key role in the campaign by Crumlin United to secure a portion of the £7m transfer of Robbie Keane from Leeds United to Tottenham Hotspur under the FIFA Solidarity Mechanism.

Personal life
Hand successfully underwent an operation for pancreatitis in 1997, after which he gave up smoking and drinking. He is heavily involved in his passion for playing music and devoting his spare time to raising funds for charities. Hand now lives in Moyvane in North Kerry with his wife Pauline.

Managerial honours
League of Ireland
 Limerick F.C. 1979/80
FAI Cup
 Limerick F.C. 1982
 SWAI Personality of the Year
 Limerick F.C. – 1980

Sources
 The Hoops by Paul Doolan and Robert Goggins

References

External links
Newcastle Fans profile

1946 births
Living people
Association footballers from Dublin (city)
Republic of Ireland national football team managers
Republic of Ireland football managers
Republic of Ireland expatriate football managers
Huddersfield Town A.F.C. managers
Huddersfield Town A.F.C. non-playing staff
Dundalk F.C. players
Shamrock Rovers F.C. players
Portsmouth F.C. players
Limerick F.C. managers
St Patrick's Athletic F.C. managers
Republic of Ireland association footballers
Republic of Ireland international footballers
League of Ireland players
League of Ireland XI players
Limerick F.C. players
League of Ireland managers
Shelbourne F.C. players
Shelbourne F.C. managers
English Football League players
Drumcondra F.C. players
Expatriate soccer players in South Africa
Stella Maris F.C. players
Association football defenders
People from Drumcondra, Dublin
Port Elizabeth City F.C. players
Lusitano F.C. (South Africa) players